The Skyros wall lizard (Podarcis gaigeae) is a species of lizards in the family Lacertidae. The species is endemic to the islands of Skyros and Piperi, Greece.

Subspecies
Two subspecies are recognized. The nominotypical subspecies, Podarcis gaigeae gaigeae, is found on Skyros and associated islets, and the other subspecies, Podarcis gaigeae weigandi, is found on the island of Piperi.

Gigantism and polymorphy
The Skyros wall lizard exhibits island gigantism on small islets surrounding Skyros. The Skyros wall lizard also exhibits a throat color polymorphy with six different throat color morphs that are expressed in both females and males.

Etymology
The specific name, gaigeae, is in honor of American herpetologist Helen Beulah Thompson Gaige.

Description
It has a deep head and a tail approximately twice the length of the body. The colouring is rather variable, usually being green, olive-green, or brownish, with a dark vertebral band and dorso-lateral stripes. The mottled flanks often have a single blue spot above the shoulder. The underparts are white, often with dark spots on the throat, the lizards on each island having characteristic markings.

Distribution
The Skyros wall lizard occurs only on Skyros and on Piperi Island in the Sporades archipelago in the northern Aegean Sea. It is the only small lizard occurring on these islands.

Habitat
The natural habitats of Podarcis gaigeae are Mediterranean-type shrubby vegetation, rocky areas, and rocky shores.

Conservation status
The Skyros wall lizard has a total area of occupancy of less than  but is common within that range. Although the population trend is unknown, no specific threats are apparent apart from the risks posed by wildfire. However the introduction onto its island home of some predatory species could threaten its survival so the International Union for Conservation of Nature has assessed its conservation status as being "vulnerable".

References

Further reading
Cattaneo A (1998). "Gli Anfibi e i Rettili delle isole greche di Skyros, Skopelos e Alonissos (Sporadi settentrionali) ". Atti Soc. italiana Sci. nat. Mus. civ. Stor. nat. Milano 139 (2): 127-149. ("Podarcis gaigeae gaigeae ", new combination, p. 131). (in Italian).
Werner F (1930). "Contribution to the Knowledge of the Reptiles and Amphibians of Greece, Especially the Aegean Islands". Occasional Papers Univ. Michigan Mus. Zool. (211): 1-46, including Plates I-VI. (Lacerta taurica gaigeae, new subspecies, pp. 9–10 + Plate I, figures 4-6; Plate II, figures 7-11).

Podarcis
Reptiles described in 1930
Taxa named by Franz Werner
Lizards of Europe
Endemic fauna of Greece
Skyros
Taxonomy articles created by Polbot